Metrodorea is a genus of flowering plants belonging to the family Rutaceae.

It is native to Peru, Bolivia and Brazil.

The genus name of Metrodorea is in honour of Metrodorus (c. 1st century BC), student of a healer named Sabinus. 
It was first described and published in Fl. Bras. Merid. Vol.1 on page 81 in 1825.

Known species
According to Kew:
Metrodorea concinna 
Metrodorea flavida 
Metrodorea maracasana 
Metrodorea mollis 
Metrodorea nigra 
Metrodorea stipularis

References

Zanthoxyloideae genera
Zanthoxyloideae
Plants described in 1825
Flora of Peru
Flora of Bolivia
Flora of Brazil